Blackhawk Network Holdings Inc. is an American privately held company that operates in the prepaid, gift card and payments industries. It sells branded physical and digital gifts, phones, prepaid debit, and incentives cards online and through a network of global retailers. Blackhawk's network reaches people through a number of different channels including in-store, online, mobile, and incentive. Blackhawk headquarters are in Pleasanton, California and the company was incorporated in 2006.

The company originated selling gift cards through Safeway stores in 2001 and then expanded to other partners in the United States. The Nordstrom gift card was one of the first items launched by the group. The company grew over the following years by expanding content, channels and markets through organic growth and acquisition. This included the acquisition of the German startup Retailo and the purchase of Parago Inc. for $290 million. In 2013, the company filed for a $200 million IPO on NASDAQ. In 2014, Safeway divested the rest of its Blackhawk Network shares to make Blackhawk a fully independent company.

History
Blackhawk was formed in 2001 as a subsidiary of Safeway Inc. The subsidiary of Safeway was created to sell gift cards in Safeway Inc. stores across the United States.

The idea for the company came about after the group (originally called Safeway Marketing Services and run by Donald Kingsborough) came up with the concept of selling gift cards at Safeway stores while researching ways Safeway could grow its business, away from traditional grocery-related products. The idea was to launch gift cards during the holidays in 2001. At the time of launch, the gift card market was relatively small, but it began to grow quickly when Safeway Inc. customers began to become more interested in convenience.

Over the next few years, Blackhawk used the gift card program in Safeway and other global retailers as a platform to partner with more merchants. Brands operating under Blackhawk included The Home Depot, Barnes & Noble and McDonald’s. During this period, Blackhawk launched GiftCardMall.com, an online store where consumers could purchase gift cards.

In August 2010, it was announced that Bill Tauscher would become the CEO of Blackhawk. Prior to this, he served as executive chairman from 2009.

In 2011. Cardpool was acquired by Blackhawk. Cardpool purchases pre-owned gift cards and sells them at large discounts. At the time of the purchase, it was decided that Cardpool would remain as a brand under the Blackhawk umbrella to further develop its gift card marketplace.

Blackhawk promoted Talbott Roche to become its president in 2010. Roche had been part of the company since it was founded in 2001. Prior to her becoming president, she was nominated for the Stevie Award Women in Business, and was also recognized by Progressive Grocer as a Top Woman in Grocery. Roche also won the prestigious Paybefore Industry Achievement Award and was named one of the Top 5 Most Interesting People in Prepaid by Paybefore News.

It was announced in 2013 that Blackhawk would be filing its IPO and launching on the NASDAQ. The stock was floated at a total value of $200 million, following sales hitting $959 million for the previous financial year. Goldman Sachs, Bank of America, Merrill Lynch, Citi and Deutsche Bank were the joint bookrunners on the deal. Blackhawk made another acquisition in 2013, buying the company InteliSpend. The acquisition was seen as an expansion in a similar market to gift cards, with InteliSpend providing corporate incentives and consumer promotion products. Around a similar period of time, the company also announced a partnership with PayPal to provide gift card services through PayPal's digital wallet.

Following the IPO announcement, Blackhawk announced the purchase of the German-based startup, Retailo. The acquisition in late 2013 was estimated to be around $50 million. Retailo would remain in Germany, operating as a subsidiary of Blackhawk. Blackhawk announced one of its most significant acquisitions in 2014 with the $290 million purchase of Parago Inc. The incentives and rewards solutions company would be a major step into incentives for Blackhawk and make up the majority of their incentives branch. Parago would provide expertise for Blackhawk in designing incentive programs, with Parago Inc. already designing reward-based incentive programs for companies including Dell, General Electric, and Toyota.

Blackhawk's parent company, Safeway Inc., completed a spin-off of Blackhawk in April 2014. This was done by distributing 37.8 million shares of Blackhawk stock to Safeway shareholders. Later that year, Blackhawk announced that they would be acquiring Dallas, Texas-based CardLab.

In January 2015, Blackhawk launched Blackhawk Engagement Solutions. The division focuses on engagement, incentive and rebate programs. Blackhawk Engagement Solutions was also formed to group together a number of incentive providers Blackhawk Network had acquired, including Incentec Solutions, Incentive CardLab, InteliSpend, and Parago. Blackhawk also announced the acquisition of Achievers and Netherlands-based DIDIX Gifting & Promotions in 2015.

In early 2016, it was announced that Talbott Roche would become the CEO while remaining in her current role as President. The move came after Blackhawk had experienced rapid growth over the previous five years, tripling its revenue. Around the same time, Blackhawk also acquired the ecommerce company, NimbleCommerce. A couple of months later, Blackhawk announced that they would be acquiring extrameasures. No terms of the deal were disclosed.

Blackhawk announced in September 2016 that they would be acquiring Grass Roots Group Holdings Ltd., a provider of customer and employee engagement solutions. According to Incentive magazine, the acquisition totaled $118 million. Following the acquisition, Grass Roots confirmed they would operate as a subsidiary company of Blackhawk's, with operations in Europe and Asia-Pacific continuing as they did prior to the acquisition.

On August 30, 2017, Blackhawk announced the acquisition of Portland, Maine-based CashStar, which provides digital gift card solutions to major retailers and restaurants, for $175 million in cash.

On January 16, 2018, Blackhawk announced that it would be acquired by Silver Lake and P2 Capital Partners for $3.5 Billion.

On April 8, 2020, Blackhawk acquired SVM Cards, a provider of gas station and retail branded gift cards in the gift and B2B spaces.

On November 6, 2020, Blackhawk Network announced it had completed its acquisition of National Gift Card (NGC), one of North America's largest card and prepaid technology companies.

In the summer of 2022, Blackhawk Network launched the employee benefits platform Blackhawk Network Extras.

Market
Blackhawk announced two major partnerships in 2015. The first was with Stockpile, to distribute gift cards on their behalf. The move was seen as innovative by the Palo Alto-based startup, as it allowed consumers to purchase a gift card that can be redeemed to open and fund an account with stock. By partnering with Blackhawk, Stockpile would sell their gift card products in retail stores already partnered with Blackhawk. Blackhawk and Samsung announced a partnership deal later the same year to allow gift cards to be integrated into Samsung Pay. The deal meant 50 global retailers would now have their gift cards accessible in Samsung's mobile wallet.

Startups have begun to partner with Blackhawk to provide their users with gift rewards. One example is with Jay S. Walker's Upside, where rewards are given to people that were flexible with their hotel and flight bookings. According to Fortune magazine, a business traveler might earn a gift card for staying at a hotel that is farther away from a convention center or taking a flight that leaves 30 minutes earlier. In May 2016, Upside and Blackhawk announced a partnership to allow businesspeople to receive gift rewards through Blackhawk.

References

External links
 Official website
 Blackhawk Network Extras Official Website

Financial services companies based in California
Holding companies of the United States
Companies based in Pleasanton, California
Financial services companies established in 2006
Holding companies established in 2006
2006 establishments in California
Companies formerly listed on the Nasdaq